Elizabeth Furse (October 13, 1936 – April 18, 2021) was a Kenya Colony-born American small business owner and former faculty member of Portland State University. She was a member of the United States House of Representatives from 1993 to 1999, representing Oregon's 1st congressional district. She was a Democrat, and was the first naturalized U.S. citizen born in Africa to win election to the United States Congress.

Early years
Furse was born in Nairobi, Kenya Colony, to a Canadian mother, Barbara Elizabeth, from Regina, Saskatchewan, and a British father, Peter Reynolds Furse. Her paternal grandparents were painter Charles Wellington Furse and nursing and military administrator Dame Katharine Furse . She grew up in South Africa. Inspired by her mother, she became an anti-apartheid activist in 1951, joining the first Black Sash demonstrations in Cape Town, South Africa.

She moved to England in 1956, before eventually moving to the United States, settling in Los Angeles, California. While in Los Angeles, she became involved in a women's self-help project in Watts, and with Cesar Chavez's United Farm Workers movement, working to unionize grape farm workers. Moving to Seattle, Washington, in 1968, she became involved in American Indian/Native American rights causes including fishing and treaty rights. She became a United States citizen in 1972. Two years later, she graduated from Evergreen State College with a B.A.

In 1978, she settled in the Portland, Oregon, area, where she attended Northwestern School of Law.  After two years of law school, she dropped out and led the efforts of several Oregon-based American Indian/Native American tribes to win federal recognition, successfully lobbying the U.S. Congress to restore federal recognition of the Coquille, Klamath, Lower Umpqua Tribe, Coos Tribe, and Grand Ronde tribes. In 1986, she co-founded the Portland-based Oregon Peace Institute, establishing a mission to develop and disseminate conflict resolution curriculum in Oregon schools.

Elections
Furse was first elected to Congress in 1992, defeating State Treasurer Tony Meeker, in a year where the number of women in the House grew from 28 to 47.

In 1994, Furse, called by one Northwest newspaper the "antithesis of Congress' traditional play-it-safe politicians", won reelection by 301 votes, defeating businessman Bill Witt during a year when the Republican Revolution produced a 54-seat gain for her opponent's party.  

In 1996, Furse won 52% of the vote in a rematch with Witt. She declined to seek reelection in 1998, explaining that the job is "public service and not a career."

Tenure in U.S. House of Representatives

In 1996, Furse and Congressman George Nethercutt (R-WA) co-founded the Congressional Diabetes Caucus and authored legislation which passed in 1997 to improve coverage of diabetes education and supplies in the Medicare program.  The Congressional Diabetes Caucus has since grown to be the largest health-related Caucus in Congress.

She also was a key player in getting funding to extend the TriMet Westside MAX Light Rail project from its originally planned terminus on the Beaverton/Hillsboro border to downtown Hillsboro. TriMet subsequently named the plaza at Sunset Transit Center after her.

Other activities
Furse and her partner John C. Platt owned Helvetia Vineyards and Winery in Helvetia, Oregon, where the couple planted grapes in 1982, and started their winery in 1992. As of 2007 the vineyard is home to both pinot noir and chardonnay grapes.

After retiring from Congress in 1999, she served as director of the Institute for Tribal Government at Portland State University. She also spearheaded the associated educational program, "Great Tribal Leaders of Modern Times" video interviews  Her continued involvement in Native American affairs also brought her some attention during U.S. Senate campaigns for her high-profile endorsements of Senator Gordon Smith (R-OR). In a 2006 interview, Furse said her support in 2002 was because they "had a lot in common on tribal issues" and cited Smith's repeated votes against drilling in the Arctic National Wildlife Refuge, votes that defied pressure from Smith's fellow Republicans including Senator Stephens [sic]; she believed "you support those people who have stood up for issues that you care about" and that Smith is a "very moral person [who] if he doesn’t agree with you, he’ll tell you" something that Furse admired. Her continued support during the 2008 campaign included praise for Smith as "one of the first to stand up to George Bush and other Republicans to end this war".

In 2014, Furse stood for election to the Washington County Board of Commissioners in District 4, but lost the race to incumbent Commissioner Bob Terry (46.57%–53.10%). She ran with the endorsements of Congresswoman Suzanne Bonamici and former Governors Barbara Roberts and Ted Kulongoski.

Furse was a member of the ReFormers Caucus of Issue One.

Death
Furse died on April 18, 2021, at age 84, at her farm near Hillsboro, of complications from a fall.

See also
 Women in the United States House of Representatives

References

External links

 

1936 births
2021 deaths
20th-century American politicians
20th-century American women politicians
21st-century American politicians
21st-century American women politicians
Accidental deaths from falls
Activists for Hispanic and Latino American civil rights
American female winemakers
American people of English descent
Evergreen State College alumni
Female members of the United States House of Representatives
Kenyan emigrants to South Africa
Kenyan people of English descent
Native Americans' rights activists
People from Nairobi
People from Washington County, Oregon
People with acquired American citizenship
Politicians from Portland, Oregon
Portland State University faculty
South African emigrants to the United States
United Farm Workers people
White Kenyan people
Women in Oregon politics
American women academics
South African people of English descent
South African people of Canadian descent
American people of Canadian descent
Democratic Party members of the United States House of Representatives from Oregon